Werner Edler-Muhr (born 4 February 1969) is an Austrian middle-distance runner. He competed in the men's 1500 metres at the 1996 Summer Olympics.

References

1969 births
Living people
Athletes (track and field) at the 1996 Summer Olympics
Austrian male middle-distance runners
Olympic athletes of Austria
Sportspeople from Graz